Daegaya is a town, or eup in Goryeong County, North Gyeongsang Province, South Korea. The township Goryeong-myeon was upgraded to the town Goryeong-eup in 1979, and it was renamed Daegaya-eup in 2015. Goryeong County Office is located in Jisan-ri, and Daegaya Town Office is in Kwaebin-ri which is crowded with people.

Communities
Daegaya-eup is divided into 13 villages (ri).

References

External links
Official website 

Goryeong County
Towns and townships in North Gyeongsang Province